Nürnberg-Laufamholz station is a railway station in the Laufamholz district of Nürnberg, Bavaria, Germany. It is located on the Nuremberg–Schwandorf line of Deutsche Bahn. It is served by the S1 of the Nuremberg S-Bahn.

References

Laufamholz
Laufamholz
Railway stations in Germany opened in 1878
1878 establishments in Bavaria